King Edward's School or King Edward VI School may refer to:

In England

Edward VI

 Foundation of the Schools of King Edward VI, Birmingham, West Midlands:
Independent schools:
King Edward's School, Birmingham (boys)
King Edward VI High School for Girls
Non-fee paying grammar schools:
King Edward VI Aston School (boys)
King Edward VI Camp Hill School for Boys
King Edward VI Camp Hill School for Girls
King Edward VI Five Ways School (co-educational)
King Edward VI Handsworth School (girls)
State-funded Academy:
King Edward VI Sheldon Heath Academy
 King Edward VI Grammar School, Chelmsford, Essex
 King Edward's School, Bath, Somerset
 King Edward VI School, Bury St Edmunds, Suffolk
 King Edward VI School, Lichfield, Staffordshire
 King Edward VI High School, Stafford, Staffordshire.
 King Edward VI Grammar School, Louth, Lincolnshire
 The King Edward VI School, Morpeth, Northumberland
 King Edward VI College, Nuneaton, Warwickshire, formerly King Edward VI Grammar School
 King Edward VI School, Southampton, Hampshire
 King Edward VI Grammar School, Spilsby, Lincolnshire: see King Edward VI Academy
 King Edward VI College, Stourbridge
 King Edward VI School, Stratford-upon-Avon, Warwickshire - which William Shakespeare attended
 King Edward's School, Witley, near Godalming in Surrey
 King Edward's School, Yeovil, Somerset
 King Edward VI Community College, Totnes, Devon
 Christ's Hospital, Horsham, West Sussex
 Norwich School in Norwich, Norfolk, previously King Edward VI's Grammar School
 Retford King Edward VI Grammar School, Retford, Nottinghamshire
 Now known as Retford Oaks Academy
 Sherborne School, Dorset, also known as King Edward's School

Edward VII
 King Edward VII School, King's Lynn, Norfolk
 King Edward VII School, Lytham
 King Edward VII and Queen Mary School, Lytham
 King Edward VII School, Melton Mowbray, Leicestershire
 King Edward VII School, Sheffield, South Yorkshire
 King Edward VII Science and Sport College (formerly King Edward VII Grammar School), Leicestershire

Elsewhere
 King Edward Public School, Toronto, Canada
 King Edward High School, former name of GIC Deoria, India
 King Edward Technical College, Dunedin, New Zealand
 King Edward VII School (Taiping), Taiping, Perak, Malaysia
 King Edward VII School (Johannesburg) in Gauteng, South Africa